The Qajars, also spelled Kadjars, Kajars, Kadzhars, Cadzhars, Cadjars, Ghajars, etc.) are a clan of the Bayat tribe of the Oghuz Turks who lived variously, with other tribes, in the area that is now Armenia, Azerbaijan and northwestern Iran. 

With the end of the Safavid era, they had split into several factions. These included the Ziyādoghlu (Ziādlu), associated with the area of Ganja and Yerevan, as well as the Qoyunlu (Qāvānlu), and Davālu (Devehlu) the latter two associated with the northern areas of contemporary Iran.

Background 
The Qajars were one of the original Turkoman Qizilbash tribes that emerged and spread in Asia Minor around tenth and eleventh centuries. They later supplied power to the Safavids since this dynasty's earliest days. Numerous members of the Qajar tribe held prominent ranks in the Safavid state. In 1794, a Qajar chieftain, Agha Mohammed, a member of the Qoyunlu branch of the Qajars, founded the Qajar dynasty which replaced the Zand dynasty in Iran. He launched his campaign from his power base south of the Caspian Sea, capturing its capital Isfahan in 1785. A year later, Tehran accepted Mohammed's authority.

According to Olson et al., which was published in 1994 and specifically deals with the ethnography of the Russian Empire and Soviet Union, the Qajars were historically a Turkic tribe that lived in Armenia. They resettled in the region of Azerbaijan during the seventeenth and eighteenth centuries. They are considered to be a subgroup of the Azerbaijanis. Olston et al. adds that in the 1980s the Qajar population exceeded 35,000 people, most of whom lived in Iran.

A branch, attested only as ‘Kadzhar’ (i.e. ‘Qajar’ via Cyrillic transcription), lived in Russian Armenia in the 19th century and likely earlier. In 1873, they numbered 5,000.

See also
 Qajar dynasty
 Qajar family tree

References

Sources
 Akiner, Shiran (1983) Islamic Peoples of the Soviet Union Kegan Paul International, London, 
 
 Wixman, Ronald (1984) The Peoples of the USSR: An Ethnographic Handbook

Further reading

External links
 International Qajar Studies Association. Origins of the Qajars (Kadjars)

Peoples of the Caucasus
Karabakh Khanate
Qajar tribe
Bayat tribe
Muslim communities of the Caucasus